Soracovirus is a subgenus of viruses in the genus Alphacoronavirus, consisting of a single species, Sorex araneus coronavirus T14.

References

Virus subgenera
Alphacoronaviruses